Oleg Negin (born 2 July 1970) is a Russian screenwriter and novelist. He was born in Moscow.

Negin's novels include П.Ушкин and Кипарис во дворе, published in 2004. In film, he became a collaborator with director Andrey Zvyagintsev, and at the 2014 Cannes Film Festival their Leviathan won the Best Screenplay Award. For their 2017 film Loveless, Negin and Zvyagintsev were jointly nominated for the European Film Award for Best Screenwriter.

Filmography
Negin's films include:
 The Banishment (2007)
 Elena (2011)
 Leviathan (2014)
 Loveless (2017)

References

21st-century Russian novelists
1970 births
Russian male novelists
Russian screenwriters
Living people
Writers from Moscow
Cannes Film Festival Award for Best Screenplay winners